Joey is a 1986 film written and directed by Joseph Ellison, based on a story by Ellen Hammill. The rock and roll movie features songs by Tim Worman and the Polecats and performances by the Ad-Libs, the Silhouettes, Screamin' Jay Hawkins and others.

Plot

Joey King Sr. (James Quinn) was part of a successful singing group in the 1950s and now works at a gas station and is a borderline alcoholic. His son, Joey Jr. (Neill Barry) has started a rock band with his teenage friends which triggers anger in his father and he takes away his son's guitar.

The father is jealous of the son's talent until the father starts his old band back up and both Kings separately participate in the Royal New York Doo-Wopp Show at Radio City Music Hall and accept one another.

Principal cast

Critical reception
Critic Janet Maslin of The New York Times did not care much for the movie:

References

External links
 
 
 Original New York Times Review

1986 films
1980s musical drama films
American musical drama films
American rock music films
Films set in New York City
Films shot in New York City
American independent films
1986 drama films
1980s English-language films
1980s American films